Howmeh Rural District is a rural district (dehestan) in the Central District of Lamerd County, Fars Province, Iran. At the 2006 census, its population was 4,087, in 899 families.  The rural district has 26 villages.

References 

Rural Districts of Fars Province
Lamerd County